Margaret Carlson is an American journalist, political pundit, and an opinion columnist for Bloomberg News. She is known for being the first female columnist for Time magazine. She was a regular panelist for CNN's Capital Gang from 1992 until its cancellation in 2005.

Early life, family and education
Margaret Carlson was born Margaret Bresnahan to James Francis Xavier Bresnahan and Mary Catherine McCreary Bresnahan. She graduated from   | Bishop McDevitt High School in Harrisburg, Pennsylvania.

Carlson earned a B.A. degree in English from Penn State University, then worked for several years before earning a J.D. degree from George Washington University Law School in Washington, D.C.

Career
Carlson spent a year after college working at the U.S. Department of Labor and three other agencies. She subsequently taught third grade in Watts, Los Angeles, California, before joining Nader's raiders.  After law school, she was briefly a Federal Trade Commission lawyer under Michael Pertschuk, until the Carter administration ended.

Her journalism career has included stints as Washington bureau chief for Esquire, editor of the short-lived Washington Weekly, and was a reporter and member of the editorial staff for the Washington-based national weekly newspaper "Legal Times." She was managing editor at The New Republic until January 1988, when she joined Time magazine. In 1994, she became the first female columnist in the magazine's history. Carlson covered four presidential elections for Time, but in 2005 she left for Bloomberg News where she writes a column.

At CNN she was a commentator on Inside Politics and, for 15 years, a panelist on The Capital Gang. She writes a weekly column for The Daily Beast.

Personal life
She was married to Eugene Carlson, but they divorced. They share one daughter. Margaret Carlson resides in Washington,D.C.

Bibliography

References

External links

 Margaret Carlson's Blog at HuffPost
 Bloomberg archive

  (circular reference to this article)

Living people
Year of birth missing (living people)
Television
Bloomberg L.P. people
CNN people
George Washington University Law School alumni
HuffPost writers and columnists
Los Angeles Times people
MSNBC people
Pennsylvania State University alumni
People from Camp Hill, Pennsylvania
The New Republic people
Time (magazine) people
21st-century American women